The Marías are an American indie pop band from Los Angeles, California. They are known for performing songs in both English and Spanish, as well as infusing their music with elements like jazz percussion, guitar riffs, smoke-velvet vocals, and horn solos. María Zardoya is the lead vocalist with Josh Conway on drums. In concert they are joined by Jesse Perlman on guitar, Doron Zounes on bass, Edward James on keyboards, and Gabe Steiner on trumpet. Carter Lee played bass with the band until his 2019 departure.

History 
The band is named after its lead singer María Zardoya who was born in Puerto Rico and raised in Atlanta, Georgia. She and her partner Josh Conway, the drummer, met at a show at the Kibitz Room, the bar and music venue inside Canter's Deli in Los Angeles. She was performing on the bill and he was managing the sound, something he had never done before. They began writing almost immediately after meeting, and subsequently began dating. Soon they recruited close friends to join as band members; Edward James on keyboards, and guitarist Jesse Perlman. They were offered an opportunity to make songs for television, which helped them understand the visual and sonic feel that they were striving for, but when it did not materialize, they used their recordings to make an EP, entitled Superclean Vol. I. Vol. I was released in 2017, while its counterpart Vol. II was released in 2018. In September 2021, their single "Hush" topped the Billboard Adult Alternative Airplay chart, becoming their first chart-topping single. On November 23, the Recording Academy announced that band's debut album Cinema was nominated for a Grammy Award in the category Best Engineered Album, Non-Classical. In 2022, the band went on tour in promotion of Cinema and opened for Halsey on her Love and Power Tour. 

In 2022, they collaborated with Bad Bunny on the song “Otro Atardecer” from his album Un Verano Sin Ti.

Influences 
María Zardoya has stated that her influences include the late Tejano singer Selena, Norah Jones, Sade, Nina Simone, Billie Holiday, Carla Morrison, Julieta Venegas, Erykah Badu, and filmmaker Pedro Almodóvar, while Conway is influenced by Tame Impala, Radiohead, D'Angelo, and the Strokes.

Zardoya stated that although Conway was not familiar with her Spanish roots, the band was nevertheless open to experimenting with new styles, ultimately leading to several Spanish-language tracks across their releases.

Discography

Studio albums 
 Cinema (2021) – No. 176 US Billboard 200

Extended plays 
 Superclean Vol. I (2017)
 Superclean Vol. II (2018)

Singles 
 "Drip" (featuring Triathlon) (2018)
 "...Baby One More Time" (2019)
 "Out for the Night" (live) (2019)
 "Hold It Together" (2020)
 "Jupiter" (2020)
 "Exit Music for a Film" (2020)
 "Care for You" (2020)
 "Bop It Up!" (2020)
 "We're the Lucky Ones" (2020)
 "Hush" (2021)
 "Un Millón" (2021)
 "Little by Little" (2021)
 "Kyoto" (The Marías Remix) (2021)
 "In or In-Between" (Remix) (2021)
 "Hush" (Still Woozy Remix) (2021)
 "Hush" (Spotify Singles) (2021)
 "Dakiti" (Spotify Singles) (2021)

References 

Indie rock musical groups from California
2016 establishments in California
Musical groups from Los Angeles
Musical groups established in 2016
Psychedelic rock music groups from California
Latin music groups